The Mississippi Historical Society (MHS) is a historical society located in the U.S. state of Mississippi. The society was established in 1858 but was terminated soon after because of the outbreak of the American Civil War. It remained in hiatus until 1890, after which it published extensively over the next 35 years and helped establish the Mississippi Department of Archives and History in 1902. After a second protracted hiatus from 1925 until 1952, the society re-emerged and has remained in continuous operation ever since.

The society publishes the Journal of Mississippi History and the online publication Mississippi History Now, which contains more than 150 essays about topics in Mississippi history.

History

Establishment

The Mississippi Historical Society (MHS) was founded in Jackson on November 9, 1858. The initial incarnation of the society was short-lived, expiring after only two years owing to the outbreak of the American Civil War.

Second incarnation

After a thirty-year hiatus, it was restarted in 1890 on the University of Mississippi campus in Oxford. On the campus, the society had closed meetings and it suffered from lack of resources and interest until history professor Franklin Lafayette Riley Jr. sought counsel from his academic mentor, Herbert Baxter Adams, other state educators, and Civil War veterans like Confederate general Stephen D. Lee.

Beginning in 1898, the rejuvenated MHS began a series of 14 annual volumes entitled Publications of the Mississippi Historical Society, containing significant scholarship on the history of the state. This was continued in 1916 with the publication of a new series of five additional volumes under the editorship of historian Dunbar Rowland.

The society was instrumental in establishing the Mississippi Department of Archives and History in 1902, and the two organizations worked in close cooperation until the MHS expired once again in 1925.

Society today

The Mississippi Historical Society was relaunched for a third time in 1952 and has maintained itself in continuous operation ever since. The society publishes the quarterly Journal of Mississippi History, the monthly Mississippi History Newsletter, and the online journal History Now.

In 2007, Mississippi State University history professor emeritus John F. Marszalek served as president of the Mississippi Historical Society. He is renowned for his original and creative work on the history of the Civil War and Reconstruction. His ascendancy to the presidency of the society is notable considering that he is one of the few northern-born members to serve in that position. During the early 2000s, the MHS repeatedly honored historians for their work on Mississippi history, notably Charles C. Bolton—Department Chair at the University of North Carolina at Greensboro and author of the highly critical 2005 book The Hardest Deal of All: The Battle Over School Integration in Mississippi, 1870-1980.

In addition, in 2007 the MHS invited Bolton and James W. Loewen, author of The Mississippi Chinese: Between Black and White, to speak at the annual meeting. Loewen is notable for filing a federal lawsuit against the state of Mississippi in 1975 over the state's rejection of his textbook, Mississippi: Conflict & Change, co-authored by historian Charles Sallis, from use in the state's public schools.

Footnotes

Further reading
 Franklin L. Riley (ed.), Publications of the Mississippi Historical Society. In 14 volumes. Oxford, MS: Mississippi Historical Society, 1898-1914. • vol. 1 & 2 | vol. 3 | vol. 4 | vol. 5 | vol. 6 | vol. 7 | vol. 8 | vol. 9 | vol. 10 | vol. 11 | vol. 12 | vol. 13 | vol. 14
 Dunbar Rowland (ed.), Publications of the Mississippi Historical Society. In 5 volumes. Jackson, MS: Mississippi Historical Society, 1916-1925. • Centenary Series vol. 1 | Centenary Series vol. 2 | Centenary Series vol. 3 | Centenary Series vol. 4 | Centenary Series vol. 5

External links
 Official website
 Mississippi History Now
 
 

Organizations established in 1858
1858 establishments in Mississippi
State historical societies of the United States
Historical societies in Mississippi
University of Mississippi